Love Under Fire is a 1937 American drama film based upon the play by Walter C. Hackett. It was directed by George Marshall and stars Loretta Young, Don Ameche and Frances Drake. The film's sets were designed by the art director Rudolph Sternad.

Plot
During the Spanish Civil War, a detective from Scotland Yard falls in love with a woman he had believed to be a jewel thief.

Cast
 Loretta Young as Myra Cooper  
 Don Ameche as Tracy Egan  
 Borrah Minevitch as himself
 Frances Drake as Pamela Beaumont  
 Walter Catlett as Tip Conway  
 John Carradine as Capt. Delmar  
 Sig Ruman as General Montero  
 Harold Huber as Lieutenant Chaves  
 Katherine DeMille as Rosa  
 E.E. Clive as Captain Bowden  
 Don Alvarado as Lieutenant Cabana  
 Georges Renavent as Captain Contreras  
 Clyde Cook as Bert  
 George Regas as Lieutenant De Vega  
 Claude King as Cunningham
 John Bleifer as Juan 
 Agostino Borgato as Cab Driver  
 Egon Brecher as Civilian

References

External links
 

1937 films
American war drama films
Films directed by George Marshall
Spanish Civil War films
20th Century Fox films
American black-and-white films
1930s war drama films
Films scored by Arthur Lange
1937 drama films
1930s English-language films
1930s American films